Jean-Philippe Rykiel (born 1961) is a French composer, arranger, and musician, primarily a keyboard player. He has been blind since his birth, a result of negligence in the hospital incubator, and is the son of fashion designer Sonia Rykiel.

Discography

Solo
 1982 Jean-Philippe Rykiel - (Musiza/Ariola)
 1991 Nunc Music (Quiet Days In Tokyo) - Takdisc/WMD
 2003 Under The Tree (Last Call)

Collaborations
 1994 Songs of awakening / Roads of blessings (The Lama's Chant) (w/Lama Gyourmé) - (Last Call/Narada/Takticmusic)
 1996 Souhaits Pour L'Eveil (The Lama's Chant) (w/Lama Gyurme) - (Last Call/Sony)
 2000 Rain Of Blessings: Vajra Chants (w/Lama Gyurme) - (RealWorld)
 2018 Kangaba-Paris (w/Lansine Kouyate) - (Buda Musique)

Participations
1977 Vous Et Nous - Brigitte Fontaine
1978 New Jerusalem - Tim Blake
1979  Open - Steve Hillage - (Virgin)
1981  Friends Of Mr. Cairo - Jon & Vangelis - (Polydor)
1983 Catherine Lara - Catherine Lara - (Trema)
1984 En Concert - Catherine Lara - (Trema)
1985 Apartheid - Xalam (band) - (Melodie)
1985 Nelson Mandela - Youssou N'Dour - (EMI)
1986 Power Spot - Jon Hassell  - (ECM)
1987 Faton-Bloom - F.Cahen/D.Malherbe - (Cryonic)
1987 Soro - Salif Keita - (EMI)
1987 Xarit - Xalam - (BMG)
1988 I'm Your Man - Leonard Cohen - (Sony)
1988 Surgeon Of The Nightsky - Jon Hassell  - (Intutition)
1989  Domba - Ousemane Kouyaté - (Sterns)
1989 Fetish - Didier Malherbe - (Mantra)
1990 French Corazon - Brigitte Fontaine - (EMI)
1992 Eyes Open - Youssou N'Dour - (Sony)
1993 Les Romantiques - Catherine Lara - (Trema)
1993 Zef - Didier Malherbe - (Tangram)
1994 Soro - - Salif Keita - (Island)
1994 Wommat - Youssou N'Dour - (Sony)
1995 Emotion - Papa Wemba - (Real World)
1995 Folon - Salif Keita  - (Island)
1996 Kaoutal - Kaoutal - (Sony)
1996 Mansa - Super Rail Band - (Label Bleu)
1996 Vago - Marcel Loeffler - (Tam Tam)
1996 Wapi Yo - - Lokua Kanza - (BMG)
1997 Contes D'Afrique De L'Ouest - Mamadou Diallo - (CKT)
1998 Castles made of sand - Alexkid - (F-Communications)
1998 Paradis Païen - Jacques Higelin (Tôt ou Tard/Warner)
1999 Papa - Salif Keita - (Island)
2000 Joko - Youssou N'Dour - (Sony)
2001 Bienvenida - Alexkid (F-Communications)
2001 Kekeland - Brigitte Fontaine (Virgin)
2001 What I did On My Holidays - Alexkid (F-Communications)
2002 Nothing's In Vain - Youssou N'Dour (Nonesuch/Warner)
2002 Samba Alla - Diogal (Celluloid/Mélodie)
2002 Wati - Amadou & Mariam  (Universal Music Jazz)
2003 Mint - Alexkid - (F-Communications)

References

External links
 
 Last Call Records   Under The Tree (audio samples) (RealPlayer)

French musicians
French people of Romanian-Jewish descent
1961 births
Living people
Blind musicians
French blind people